Niklas Persson (born March 26, 1979) is a Swedish former professional ice hockey player who most notably played as captain for Linköpings HC in the Swedish Hockey League (SHL). He is the current president of hockey operations with Linköpings HC.

Persson retired from hockey in 2018 after playing more than 600 SHL games. After a brief return to playing with Mjölby HC in the Division 2, Persson continued to work within Linköpings HC, given the role of assistant general manager before assuming the general manager's role to begin the 2019–20 season.

Persson is the cousin of Robert Nilsson who also plays professional ice hockey.

Career statistics

Regular season and playoffs

International

References

External links

1979 births
HC CSKA Moscow players
Leksands IF players
Linköping HC players
Living people
HC Neftekhimik Nizhnekamsk players
SC Rapperswil-Jona Lakers players
Swedish ice hockey centres
Swedish expatriate sportspeople in Russia
Swedish expatriate ice hockey players in the United States